Captain Video: Master of the Stratosphere is an American adventure horror science fiction film 15-chapter serial released by Columbia Pictures in 1951. It was directed by Spencer Gordon Bennet and Wallace A. Grissel with a screenplay by Royal G. Cole, Sherman I. Lowe and Joseph F. Poland, based on a treatment by George H. Plympton.  The serial is unique for several reasons--- in particular, it is the only film serial ever based on a television program, Captain Video and His Video Rangers.

Plot
Judd Holdren, in what was only his second starring screen role, plays Captain Video, the leader of a group of crime-fighters known as the Video Rangers. He faces an interplanetary menace, as the evil dictator of the planet Atoma, Vultura (Gene Roth) and his lackey, the traitorous earth scientist Dr. Tobor (George Eldredge) are planning to conquer the earth.

Cast
 Judd Holdren as Captain Video
 Larry Stewart as Ranger
 George Eldredge as Dr. Tobor
 Gene Roth as Vultura
 Don C. Harvey as Gallagher (as Don Harvey)
 William Fawcett as Alpha [Chs. 1–3,7,15]
 Jack Ingram as Henchman Aker [Chs. 1,7,10–14]
 I. Stanford Jolley as Zorol [Chs. 8–9]
 Skelton Knaggs as Retner
 Jimmy Stark as Ranger Rogers
 Rusty Wescoatt as Henchman Beal [Chs. 1,7,11] 
 Zon Murray as Henchman Elko [Chs. 1,7,10–14]

Production
Captain Video: Master of the Stratosphere was the only serial adapted from television.

It was one of Katzman's first forays into science fiction and was soon followed by The Lost Planet.

As produced by Sam Katzman, the serial had a production budget much larger than the famously small budget of the DuMont Television Network's live daily television series.

Captain Video and his teenaged sidekick, the otherwise nameless "Video Ranger" (Larry Stewart), must make frequent visits both to Atoma and to another distant planet, Theros. Both Atoma and Theros are filmed at Bronson Canyon, and Vasquez Rocks, so to distinguish the two, the Atoma footage is tinted pink and the Theros footage is tinted green in the original release prints. These colored scenes were processed by Cinecolor.

This was the second of only three science fiction serials released by Columbia.  The third, The Lost Planet (1953), is a virtual sequel although with different character names.

Release

Theatrical
Captain Video: Master of the Stratosphere was very successful when first released to theaters, and kept playing long after other serials had been retired to the vaults. It is one of only two serials that Columbia reissued three times (in 1958, 1960, and 1963).

Critical reception
Harmon and Glut describe this serial as a "rather shoddy, low budget space cliffhanger."

Gadgets
The serial includes several science fiction gadgets of the era.  The Opticon Scillometer was used for looking through walls.  Objects were made to disappear with the Isotropic Radiation Curtain. The Mu-ray Camera could photograph lingering images after the event.  Temporary madness could be caused with the Psychosomatic Weapon.  A variation on Radar was entitled the Radionic Directional Beam and the Radionic Guide and a Vibrator gun that worked like a Tazer.

Chapter titles
 Journey into Space
 Menace of Atoma
 Captain Video's Peril
 Entombed in Ice
 Flames of Atoma
 Astray in the Stratosphere
 Blasted by the Atomic Eye
 Invisible Menace
 Video Springs a Trap
 Menace of the Mystery Metal
 Weapon of Destruction
 Robot Rocket
 Mystery of Station X
 Vengeance of Vultura
 Video vs. Vultura
Source:

See also

 1951 in film
 List of science fiction films of the 1950s

References
 
 Science Fiction Serials by Roy Kinnard (McFarland, North Carolina, 1998).

External links
 
 
 Roaring Rockets: The Captain Video Serial
 Roaring Rockets: The Serial Page
 Review by Dave Sindelar
 Review by Brian Thomas
 Gary Johnson, "The Serials"
 Captain Video article at Todd Gault's Movie Serial Experience

1951 films
1950s English-language films
1950s science fiction adventure films
American black-and-white films
Columbia Pictures film serials
Films based on television series
Films directed by Spencer Gordon Bennet
American science fiction adventure films
Films with screenplays by George H. Plympton
Films with screenplays by Joseph F. Poland
1950s American films